Chicuelo may refer to:

 Chicuelo (bullfighter), Manuel Jiménez Moreno "Chicuelo" (1902-1967), Spanish bullfighter
 Chicuelo (guitarist) (1968), Catalan flamenco guitarist
Chicuelo, horse which won Tremont Stakes 1939, named after the bullfighter